Humayun Saeed Ansari (born 27 July 1971), professionally known as Humayun Saeed, is a Pakistani actor and producer.

He has appeared in dozens of Pakistani television dramas and limited number of films, and earned Lux Style Awards, and ARY Film Awards. Primarily known as an actor, Saeed also runs the Six Sigma Plus media production house  which produces television drama serials and commercial movies.

Early life and family
Saeed was born on 27 July 1971 in Karachi into “a liberal and well-educated Punjabi family.”

Saeed attended Nasra School in Karachi where he excelled in his studies and earned the distinction throughout his academic career until matriculation.

Later he enrolled himself at a prominent institution St. Patrick's college in Karachi and earned a bachelor's degree in commerce. Saeed stated he was happily employed at a garments factory, as a general manager, before he got into the showbiz.

He described himself as "shy" when growing up.

He said in an interview, that at the start of his career his parents were against him acting. They did not approve of his showbiz career. But with the passage of time, they saw his passion and started supporting him. On the other hand, he mentioned that his wife comes from a very conservative family. She initially had a lot of problems with his career of choice but now supports him.

Saeed has four brothers, with Salman Saeed also being an actor.

Career

Debut and breakthrough
Saeed began his career as a television producer in the late 80s. His maiden production did not produce favorable results. After stepping into showbiz, Saeed's powerful presence caught the eye of directors and he was cast in the TV shows for acting roles. He made his acting debut in 1995 with Karooron Ka Aadmi produced by Nadeem Ali Khan, followed by Ye Jahaan, a musical that was telecast in 1996. The same year he was declared best actor for his performance in Ab Tum Ja Saktay Ho, directed by Mehreen Jabbar, in which he was cast opposite Sania Saeed and Khalida Riyasat.

Saeed continued doing TV productions alongside. He partnered with Sultana Siddiqui in late 90s and then Abdullah Kadwani in 2000s for 7th Sky Entertainment. Later, he started his own production house along with "Shehzad Nasib"  under the banner "Six Sigma Plus". Since then he has produced notable content for Pakistani television viewers.

Saeed's initial notable TV work as an actor includes Mehndi, Doraha, Kabhi Kabhi Pyar Mein, Kaafir, Uraan, Hum Se Juda Na Hona, Ladies Park and guest roles in Meri Zaat Zarra-e-Benishan and Daam.In 2005, Saeed starred in the Hadiqa Kiani's award-winning music video called Iss Baar Milo, directed by Jami. Saeed has made appearance on reality shows like Living on the edge as a participant. He also judged a dancing reality show on ARY Digital in 2009. He has also worked in an Indian Bollywood movie "Jashan" in 2009 where he was given a negative role. In 2016, He gained recognition by playing Mohid in Dil Lagi among television audience. In 2020, he return to television and played the role of Danish in drama serial Meray Paas Tum Ho, where he took all the credit of making it the best serial ever made in history of Pakistan. The drama went so far in fame that India who is known for their movies also appreciated the performance and drama storyline. On social media Indian people reacted very positively and showed their love for Humayun openly, comparing him with their topline actor Shahrukh Khan.

In January, 2022, Saeed was cast as Dr. Hasnat Khan (known for his romantic involvement with Princess Diana), in the fifth season of The Crown.

Films
Saeed made his film debut in 1999 with Samina Peerzada's movie Inteha. He portrayed the negative role in Inteha and went on to receive the National Award – Best Actor – for his role in his very first film. Due to poor conditions of Pakistan Film Industry at that time, he did only limited number of movies until the revival of cinema began in 2013. He has done many movies since the resurgence of cinema in 2013. These include commercially successful films such as Main Hoon Shahid Afridi, Bin Roye, Jawani Phir Nahi Ani and Punjab Nahi Jaungi. His film Jawani Phir Nahi Ani holds the record of being the fourth highest-grossing Pakistani film of all time, while his another film Punjab Nahi Jaungi has been declared as the second highest-grossing Pakistani film of all time and the highest-grossing film of 2017 in Pakistani cinema. In 2018, he starred in film Jawani Phir Nahi Ani 2. As of 2019, the film is the highest-grossing Pakistani film of all time. After its huge box office success, he announced three more films in an interview with Dawn Images, saying that third film in JPNA franchise is in plans to be out "in two years", while he added, "we're working on two other films, one's being written by Khalil-ur-Rehman Qamar and the other by Vasay Chaudhry." In 2022, he appeared in Nadeem Baig's London Nahi Jaunga.

Awards
Saeed is one of the most famous Pakistani actors. He has received numerous award nominations and honours including a minimum of 5 Lux Style Awards. He received special recognition awards at Pakistan Achievement Awards 2015 UK and Europe and at fourth Hum Awards in 2016 for his invaluable contribution towards revival of Pakistani cinema. Saeed's film Jawani Phir Nahi Ani swept the ARY Film Awards ceremony with total of 17 awards, also earning him the award for the best male actor in a leading role. The Actor was awarded Pride of Performance by President of Pakistan on 23 March 2021.

Filmography

Television

As an actor
{|class="sortable wikitable"
|-
! Year
! Title
! Role
! Network
! Notes 
|-
|1996
|Farar
|Asad
|Pakistan Television Corporation
|Telefilm
|-
|1998
|Dhoop Mein Sawan
|Taimoor
|Pakistan Television Corporation
|
|-
|1998
|Ghazi Shaheed
|Lieutenant Bashir
|Pakistan Television Corporation
|
|-
|2000
|Aur Zindagi Badalti Hai|Zain
|PTV Home
|
|-
| rowspan="2"|2001
|Pehli Khwahish
|
|PTV Home
|
|-
|The Castle: Aik Umeed|
|PTV Home
|
|-
|2002
|Chaandni Raatain|Asim
|PTV Home
|
|-
|2003
|Mehndi|Shahzaib
|PTV Home
|
|-
| rowspan="3"|2004
|Umrao Jaan Ada|Faiz Ali
|Geo TV
|
|-
|Ana|
|Geo TV
|
|-
|Anjaane Raaste|
|PTV Home
|
|-
|2005
|Riyasat|Ahmed Nawaz
|ARY Digital
|
|-
|2007
|Wilco|
|PTV Home
|
|-
| rowspan="2"|2008
|Doraha|Umer
|Geo TV
|
|-
|Dil Kay Afsanay|
|ARY Digital
|
|-
| rowspan="2"|2009
| Ishq Junoon Deewangi|Sahil Sher
|Hum TV
|
|-
| Aashti|Abrash
|Hum TV
|
|-
| 2010
|Ijazat|Hamza
|ARY Digital
|
|-
| rowspan="2"|2009-2010
|Ishq Ki Inteha|Malik Farhad
|Geo TV
|
|-
|Meri Zaat Zarra-e-Benishan|Shuja
|Geo TV
|
|-
|2010
|Daam|
|ARY Digital
|Guest Appearance
|-
| rowspan="2"|2010-2011
|Yeh Zindagi Hai|
|Geo TV
|Guest Appearance
|-
|Uraan|Dr.Faraz
|Geo TV
|
|-
| rowspan="5"|2011
|Ladies Park|Sarmad (Sarmi)
|Geo TV
|
|-
|Mohabbat Rooth Jaye Toh|Shahnawaz
|Hum TV
|
|-
|Kaafir|Shahan Ali Khan
|ARY Digital
|
|-
|Neeyat|Sikandar
|ARY Digital
|
|-
|Omar Dadi aur Gharwalay|
|ARY Digital
|
|-
|2016
|Dil Lagi 
|Mohid
|ARY Digital
|
|-
|2016-2017
|Bin Roye|Irtaza Muzaffar
|Hum TV
|
|-
| rowspan="2"|2019-2020
|Meray Paas Tum Ho|Danish Akhtar
|ARY Digital
|
|-
|Ehd-e-Wafa|Humayun
|Hum TV
|Guest Appearance
|-
|2020-2021
| Jeeto Pakistan League|Himself
|ARY Digital
|Captain Karachi Lions
|-
| rowspan="2"|2022
|The Crown|Dr Hasnat Khan
|Netflix
| Recurring
|-
|Main Manto Nahin Houn|
|ARY Digital
|In-Production
|}

As producerMooratRiyasatMakanDorahaMeri Zaat Zarra-e-BenishanDaamRoshan Sitara ManzilSarkar Sahab Woh Pagal Si Full FryMere HumsafarHabs''

Awards and nominations

Other awards and honours 

Best Actor for musical telefilm "Zeher" by Yasir Akhtar
Best Actor Award at Pakistan Achievement Awards
Pride of Performance by President of Pakistan
Recognition for contribution to Pakistani cinema

Lux Style Awards

Acting Awards

Production Awards

See also 
 List of Pakistani actors

References

External links 
 

Living people
Pakistani male film actors
Pakistani male television actors
Male actors from Karachi
Pakistani television producers
Pakistani male models
Punjabi people
1971 births
St. Patrick's High School, Karachi alumni
PTV Award winners
Six Sigma Plus